Sam Hutsby (born 29 October 1988) is an English professional golfer.

Amateur career
Hutsby had a successful amateur career, working under the tutelage of golf coach Sam Torrance until they broke up in June 2008. In 2009 he lost the finals of The Amateur Championship at Formby Golf Club to Matteo Manassero, the youngest winner ever. He won the Spanish Amateur in 2006, which allowed him to play in the Spanish Open, and lost the Spanish finals to Reinier Saxton in 2009.

In April 2009, Hutsby was 6th on the World Amateur Golf Ranking, the highest ranked English player at that time.

He played the Walker Cup in 2009, losing his first singles, winning the Sunday foursomes with Wallace Booth and the Sunday singles, becoming the team's joint leading points scorer.

Professional career
The day after the 2009 Walker Cup Hutsby turned professional, as did Gavin Dear, the highest ranked Scottish amateur. Their manager is the Wasserman Media Group.

His first appearance as a professional was in October 2009 at the Alfred Dunhill Links Championship, which was won by Simon Dyson. At the year-ending Qualifying School Hutsby finished 2nd behind Simon Khan, to earn a place on the European Tour for 2010. At the end of his rookie season he lost his playing rights by a single position, so in 2011 he played on the Challenge Tour, where he finished 48th on the ranking.

Hutsby returned to the Qualifying School in December 2011, finishing second once again behind David Dixon to secure a European Tour return.

In 2012, he finished 206th on the European Tour.  At the end of 2012, he finished 44th at Qualifying School to secure a place on the Challenge Tour in 2013.

Amateur wins
2004 Douglas Johns Trophy
2006 Spanish International Amateur Championship

Professional wins (1)

Challenge Tour wins (1)

Team appearances
Amateur
European Boys' Team Championship (representing England): 2006
Jacques Léglise Trophy (representing Great Britain & Ireland): 2006
European Amateur Team Championship (representing England): 2008, 2009
St Andrews Trophy (representing Great Britain & Ireland): 2008 (winners)
Eisenhower Trophy (representing England): 2008
Walker Cup (representing Great Britain & Ireland): 2009

See also
2009 European Tour Qualifying School graduates
2011 European Tour Qualifying School graduates
2014 Challenge Tour graduates
2022 European Tour Qualifying School graduates

References

External links

English male golfers
European Tour golfers
Sportspeople from Portsmouth
1988 births
Living people